Dai-minsar River is a river in Gujarat whose origin is near Moincêr. Its basin has a maximum length of 100 km. The total catchment area of the basin is 1180 km2.

As per district map of Porbandar, Dai-minsar is likely a tributary of Ozat River.

References

Rivers of Gujarat
Rivers of India